Mass movement may refer to:
 Mass movement (geology), the movement of rock and soil down slopes due to gravity
 Mass movement (politics), a large-scale social movement
 Mass movement (biology), a type of movement in the digestive system